Keiko Takeshita (竹下景子 Takeshita Keiko; born on September 15, 1953 in Higashi-ku, Nagoya, Japan) is a Japanese actress. She starred in the Japanese version of From Up on Poppy Hill as Hana Matsuzaki.

Filmography

Film
Blue Christmas (1978) - Saeko Nishida
Phoenix 2772 (1980) - The Phoenix (Voice)
Swan Lake (1981) - Princess Odette (Voice)
Tora-san Goes Religious? (1983) - Tomoko
Tora-san Goes North (1987) - Rinko
Tora-san Goes to Vienna (1989) - Kumiko Egami
A Class to Remember (1993) - Tajima
Sennen no Koi Story of Genji (2001) - Lady Rokujo
Arrietty (2010) - Sadako Maki (Voice)
From Up on Poppy Hill (2011) - Hana Matsuzaki (Voice)
The Wind Rises (2013) - Jiro's mother (Voice)
From Kobe (2015) - Mayumi Takeuchi
Satoshi: A Move for Tomorrow (2016) - Tomiko Murayama
Flower and Sword (2017) - Jōchin-ni
Futari no Uketorinin (2018)
Kazokuwari (2019)
Ware Yowakereba: Yajima Kajiko-den (2022)

Television drama
Ōgon no Hibi (NHK, 1978) - Kikyō
Kita no Kuni kara (Fuji TV, 1981–2002) - Yukiko
Tokugawa Ieyasu (NHK, 1983) - Lady Saigō
Sanada Taiheiki (NHK, 1985–86) - Ono no Otsū
Dokuganryū Masamune (NHK, 1987) - Katakura Kita
The Sun Never Sets (Fuji TV, 2000) - Teruko Masaki
Saka no Ue no Kumo (NHK, 2009) - Akiyama Sada
From Kobe (Sun Television, 2015) - Mayumi Takeuchi
Warotenka (NHK, 2017) - Hatsu
Okaeri Mone (NHK, 2021) - Masayo Nagaura/narrator

Other television
Quiz Derby (TBS, 1976–92)

Dubbing
#AnneFrank: Parallel Stories (2020) - Helen Mirren

Awards

References

External links
  (English section)

1953 births
Japanese actresses
Living people
People from Nagoya